Stony Clove Creek is a  creek in the Catskill Mountains in New York. It is a tributary of Esopus Creek, which in turn is a tributary of the Hudson River. It joins the Esopus in the village of Phoenicia, and has two smaller tributaries up north of Phoenicia.

Description
The Stony Clove starts near the Stony Clove Notch in Edgewood in Greene County. It originates at Notch Lake, near the Devil's Tombstone Campsite, and flows through the small villages of Edgewood and Lanesville, entering Ulster County at Chichester.

History
Early maps and deeds indicate that the Stony Clove flowed into the Warner Bushkill, or alternatively named, the Barber Bushkill, before flowing into the Esopus.  Later cartographers have changed the nomenclature of the streams so that the Barber Bushkill or Warner Bushkill flows into the Stony Clove.

It was formed about 10,000 years ago, during the last Ice age. It was formed when the same meltwater that formed the Stony Clove Notch burst through, and flooded a valley. The water, in turn, started running down through an already gouged-out pass, forming a small river.

Hydrology

Discharge

The United States Geological Survey (USGS) maintains stream gauges along Stony Clove Creek.

Turbidity
Stony Clove Creek is the largest source of turbidity and suspended-sediment concentration in the upper Esopus Creek, accounting for more turbidity than the rest of the upper Esopus watershed combined.

The USGS station along the creek in Chichester collects turbidity data every 15 minutes. The maximum daily SSC mean was 2,860 mg/L on December 1, 2010, and the minimum was under 1 mg/L over many days in late August through September 2014. The maximum daily suspended sediment discharge was 8,860 tons on September 18, 2012, and the lowest was less than 0.01 tons from January 15–17, 2012 and many days in September 2013.

Tributaries
Ox Clove Brook
Warner Creek
Hollow Tree Brook
Lanes Hollow Brook
Rhine Hollow Brook
Fenwick Brook
Lanes Hollow Brook
Christine Brook

See also

List of rivers of New York

References

Catskill/Delaware watersheds
Rivers of New York (state)
Rivers of Ulster County, New York
Rivers of Greene County, New York
Tributaries of the Hudson River